Fort Macleod is a town in southern Alberta, Canada. It was originally named Macleod to distinguish it from the North-West Mounted Police barracks (Fort Macleod, built 1874) it had grown around. The fort was named in honour of the then Commissioner of the North-West Mounted Police, Colonel James Macleod. Founded as the Municipality of the Town of Macleod in 1892, the name was officially changed to the already commonly used Fort Macleod in 1952.

History 

The fort was built as a  square on October 18, 1874. The east side held the men's quarters and the west side held those of the Mounties. Buildings such as hospitals, stores and guardrooms were in the south end. Stables and the blacksmith's shop were in the north end.

The town grew on the location of the Fort Macleod North-West Mounted Police (NWMP) Barracks, the second headquarters of the NWMP after Fort Livingstone was abandoned in 1876. Fort Macleod was originally established in 1874 on a peninsula along the Oldman River, then moved in 1884 to the present town location. The Museum of the North-West Mounted Police is located in Fort Macleod.

Once agricultural settlement and the railway came to the region, Macleod boomed. The town became a  divisional point for the Canadian Pacific Railway and frontier wood construction began to be replaced by brick and sandstone. In 1906 a fire devastated the downtown and destroyed most of the wooden buildings. From 1906 to 1912 Macleod had its greatest period of growth, as more new brick and stone building replaced the destroyed wooden ones. Then in 1912 the CPR moved the divisional point and 200 jobs to Lethbridge, devastating the local economy. Fort Macleod ceased to grow, and in 1924 was forced to declare bankruptcy. Until the 1970s, the town's economy stagnated and the buildings from the turn-of-the-century remained untouched.

In 1978 Alberta Culture started to inventory the downtown buildings, and in 1982 the downtown became Alberta's first "Provincial Historic Area".  As well, Heritage Canada started a Main Street Restoration Project in 1982, aiming to preserve the sandstone and brick buildings, some dating back to 1878.

Demographics 

In the 2016 Census of Population conducted by Statistics Canada, the Town of Fort Macleod recorded a population of 2,967 living in 1,226 of its 1,426 total private dwellings, a  change from its 2011 population of 3,117.

Geography 
The town is located in the Municipal District of Willow Creek No. 26, at the intersection of Highway 2 and Highway 3, on the Oldman River. It lies west of the larger community of Lethbridge, near the reserves of the Peigan and Kainai First Nations. It is also located close to the Waterton Lakes National Park.

The wind farm has a capacity of 75 megawatts of electricity.

Climate 
Fort Macleod experiences a humid continental climate (Köppen climate classification Dfb).

The community enjoys frequent breaks from cold spells in winter when the Chinook wind blows down-slope from the Rocky Mountains.

Sports 

The town is home to the Fort Macleod Mustangs, Senior AA men's hockey team of the Ranchland Hockey League.

Media 
Fort Macleod's local weekly newspaper is the Fort Macleod Gazette.

Historical newspapers
 Macleod Advertiser — published May 25, 1909, through September 11, 1913
 Macleod Chronicle — in print approximately July 1908 through June 1909
 Macleod Gazette — early issues were entitled The Macleod Gazette and Alberta Stock Record
 Macleod News — ran from November 2, 1916, through to June 1919
 Macleod Spectator — lasted from April 30, 1912, until October 26, 1916

A selection of historical newspapers from Fort Macleod have been digitized from microfilm and are available in the Southern Alberta Newspaper Collection from the University of Lethbridge Library digitized collections. Included are: Macleod Advertiser (1908–1913), Macleod Chronicle (1908–1909), Macleod Gazette (1897–1907), Macleod News (1916–1919), & Macleod Spectator (1912–1916).

Notable people 
 Henrietta Muir Edwards (1849–1931), women's rights activist
 Frederick Maurice Watson Harvey (1888–1980), Irish-Canadian soldier and rugby union athlete
 Sir Frederick Haultain (1857–1942), former premier of the North-West Territories
 Joni Mitchell (born 1943), musician
 Ryland Moranz (born 1986), musician
 Constantine Scollen (1841–1902), missionary
 John Wort Hannam (born 1968), musician

Film 

The 2005 romantic drama film Brokeback Mountain was filmed in part in Fort Macleod. The laundry apartment is located at 2422 Third Avenue, where a sign is posted marking the "passionate reunion" of Jack and Ennis. Passchendaele was also filmed in Fort Macleod's historic downtown, which acted as a stand-in for Calgary circa 1915. Scenes involving the dust storm and Matthew McConaughey's character were also filmed in Fort Macleod in Christopher Nolan's 2014 film Interstellar, where the giant dust clouds were created on location using large fans to blow cellulose-based synthetic dust through the air. Francesco Lucente's motion picture drama Badland was filmed mostly in Fort Macleod. Francesco Lucente lived in Fort Macleod from 1974 to 1978. His father Salvatore Lucente owned the American and Queens Hotels during that time.

The downtown historic buildings were also used in the 2021 film Ghostbusters: Afterlife.

See also 
Fort Macleod Airport
List of communities in Alberta
List of towns in Alberta
RCAF Station Fort Macleod

References 

Famous Five Foundation biography of Henrietta Muir Edwards
http://www.usask.ca/history/buffalo/About%20Buffalo.htm

External links 

1892 establishments in the Northwest Territories
Forts or trading posts on the National Historic Sites of Canada register
Hudson's Bay Company forts
Municipal District of Willow Creek No. 26
National Historic Sites in Alberta
North-West Mounted Police forts
Provincial Historic Areas of Alberta
Towns in Alberta
1892 establishments in Alberta